Postcrossing is an online project for people to exchange postcards with other project members globally. The project's tag line is "send a postcard and receive a postcard back from a random person somewhere in the world!" The name Postcrossing is a union of the words postcard and crossing, and its origin "is loosely based on the Bookcrossing site". 

Members can get details of other randomly selected members to send a postcard to, then receive cards from other random members. Official exchanges between the two members occur only once, but unofficial ongoing swaps between members are possible. 
As of April 2021, Postcrossing had over 800,000 members in 208 countries. By January 2023, 70 million registered postcards had been exchanged.

How it works
To be eligible to receive a postcard, a member must first send one. When a member requests to send a postcard they are given the address of another member and a unique postcard ID (e.g. US-787). They send a postcard to that address with the postcard ID displayed. Costs of postcards and postage fees are the responsibility of the user sending the card.
When the recipient registers that postcard ID, the sender becomes eligible to receive postcards.
Each member can write profile text visible to the sender which can contain personal information and postcard preferences. The Postcrossing system allows two members to exchange postcards only once. By default, members will exchange postcards with countries other than their own but they can decide to exchange postcards with other users in their own country. Users can express a preference not to send to repeated countries but this does not guarantee no repetitions.

Initially each member can have up to five postcards traveling at a time. Once five cards are in transit they need to wait for a card to be registered as received before they can request another address. This limit increases as users build experience exchanging cards, up to a maximum limit of 100. A small proportion of postcards do not get registered as received because they get lost en route, have an unreadable ID, or are received by members who are no longer active. The system attempts to adjust for these issues to reduce the difference between the number of sent and received postcards of each member.

Members
Membership is free and anyone with an address can create an account. The greatest numbers of members, known as postcrossers, are in Russia, Taiwan and China. Globally, most postcrossers reside in North America, Europe, and East Asia. As of January 2019, more than one third of the combined total of postcards were sent from Germany, Russia, and United States.

Table last updated January 17, 2023

History
Postcrossing was created by Paulo Magalhães. It was initially a hobby based on his enjoyment of receiving postcards: "The element of surprise of receiving postcards from different places in the world (many of which you would probably never have heard of) can turn your mailbox into a box of surprises – and who wouldn't like that?" He started the website on July 14, 2005, hosted at his home on an old computer in clothes closet. The project rapidly grew internationally, initially via word-of-mouth then promoted by media attention. 

The millionth Postcrossing postcard was received on April 11, 2008. The project's popularity continued to accelerate, reaching two million in February 2009. The five millionth postcard was received in August 2010, shortly after the project's fifth anniversary, and the 10 millionth postcard was registered in January 2012. As of 2023, approximately one million postcards are registered every two or three months, passing the milestone of 70 million postcards received on January 4, 2023.

Postcard Milestones

Postcrossing-themed stamps
The first Postcrossing-themed stamp was released by PostNL in 2011. Since then more than a dozen countries' postal services have followed suit, some releasing multiple Postcrossing-themed stamps. The majority of these stamps have been launched in partnership with the Postcrossing community but some "unofficial" stamps displayed the Postcrossing trademark without approval of the Postcrossing organization.

List of official Postcrossing stamps 

Stamps officially backed by the Postcrossing community are posted on the Postcrossing blog:
 PostNL, October 2011
 Posti (Finland), December 2013
 Belpochta (Belarus), January 2014
 Guernsey Post, May 2014
 Russia Post, January 2015
 Slovenia Post, May 2015
 Czech Post, September 2015
 Ukrposhta (Ukraine), October 2015
 PostNL, March 2016
 Austria Post, May 2016
 Polish Post, July 2016
 Guernsey Post, July 2016
 Belpochta, January 2017
 Romfilatelia (Romania), February 2017
 Indonesia Post, July 2017
 Swiss Post, September 2017
 An Post (Ireland), October 2017
 Magyar Posta (Hungary), February 2018
 Moldova Post, June 2018
 Åland Post, 7 June 2019
 Brazil Post, July 2020
 Guernsey Post, June 2021
 Belpochta, June 2021
 Austria Post, July 2021
 Post Luxembourg, September 2022
 Deutsche Post, October 2022

World Postcard Day (October 1st)
On October 1, 2019, Postcrossing organised global events to celebrate the postcard's 150th anniversary. Events included postcard exhibitions, special cancellations marks, postcard writing workshops and seminars, commemorative postcards and special stamp issues. Postcrossing organised an exhibition at the Universal Postal Union's (UPU) headquarters in Bern, with postcards from across the world sharing messages about the importance of postcards.

Following the success of these events, in 2020 Postcrossing launched World Postcard Day. Commemorative postcards and special cancellation marks were issued to mark the day. A commemorative postcard  for the event was chosen in a competition for design and art students. Special events included online postcard exhibitions, postcard writing workshops and online meetings. A lesson plan was created in eight languages to help teacher introduce postcards to young children in schools. Further events have been held annually since 2020.

See also
 Chain letter
 Deltiology
 Gift economy
 QSL card

References

External links
 
 
 Postcrossing Official Forum
 Postcrossing Facebook Page
 World Postcard Day website
 Interviews with Postcrossers from Bangladesh, Ethiopia, Ghana, South Africa, and Tanzania

Internet object tracking
Postcards
Portuguese social networking websites